Tumat is a rural locality (a selo), the only inhabited settlement and the administrative center of Tumatsky National Rural Okrug of Ust-Yansky District in the Sakha Republic, Russia, located  from Deputatsky, the administrative center of the district. Its population as of the 2010 Census was 533, of whom 286 were male and 247 female, down from 577 recorded during the 2002 Census.

Geography
The village is located by the right bank of the Chondon river, a little upstream from its confluence with the Nuchcha. There are numerous lakes near Tumat. Orotko, located to the northeast, is one of the largest.

Fossil specimen found at Tumat
Two canine specimen preserved in permafrost have been found nearby Tumat:
 Tumat (1, ♀): A female about 3 moths, age 12.400–14.400 y, found in 2011.
 Tumat (2, ♂): A male puppy, age 12.400–14.400 y, found in 2015 nearby the first place, so it is likely that they died at a similar time.

References

Notes

Sources
Official website of the Sakha Republic. Registry of the Administrative-Territorial Divisions of the Sakha Republic. Ust-Yansky District. 

Rural localities in Ust-Yansky District
Chondon basin